V30 may refer to :
 NEC V30, a version of the NEC V20 that was pin compatible with the 16-bit data bus Intel 8086 processor
 Honda VF500C Magna V30, a 1984-1985 Honda VF500 second generation V4
 LG V30, a smartphone released in 2017 by LG Electronics

V-30 may refer to :
 Autovía V-30 or Circunvalación de Valencia, an autovía in Spain 

V.30 may refer to :
 Fokker V.30, a variant of the German Fokker D.VIII aircraft